The Estadio Centenario is a multi-purpose stadium in Cuernavaca, Mexico. Its primary current use is for football matches and is the home stadium of Escorpiones F.C. (2021–present). The stadium has a capacity of 14,800 people and was opened in 1969 and renovated in 2009.

References 

Football venues in Mexico
Athletics (track and field) venues in Mexico
Sports venues in Morelos